The flag of Molise is one of the official symbols of the region of Molise, Italy.

Symbolism
The flag is a field of light blue, with the coat of arms of the region (red with a diagonal white band and an eight-pointed white star in the canton) in the centre. The words "Regione Molise" are in gold below.

References

Molise
Molise
Molise